HMS G7 was a British G-class submarine built for the Royal Navy during World War I.

Description
The G-class submarines were designed by the Admiralty in response to a rumour that the Germans were building double-hulled submarines for overseas duties. They displaced  on the surface and  submerged. The G-class submarines had a crew of 30 officers and ratings. They had a partial double hull.

For surface running, the boats were powered by two  Vickers two-stroke diesel engines, each driving one propeller shaft. When submerged each propeller was driven by a  electric motor. They could reach  on the surface and  underwater.

The boats were intended to be armed with one 21-inch (53.3 cm) torpedo tube in the bow and two 18-inch (45 cm) torpedo tubes on the beam. This was revised, however, while they were under construction, the 21-inch tube was moved to the stern and two additional 18-inch tubes were added in the bow. They carried two 21-inch and eight 18-inch torpedoes. The G-class submarines were also armed with a single  deck gun.

Career
Like the rest of her class, G7s role was to patrol an area of the North Sea in search of German U-boats. On 15 April 1917, G7 was patrolling between Lerwick and Bergen when she sighted the German submarine . G7 fired a torpedo at U-30 and after an exchange of gunfire the German submarine dived away. Although U-30 escaped unscathed, G7 had interrupted U30s attempts to sink two Norwegian merchant ships. One, which still had a boarding party from U-30 aboard, returned to Bergen under her own steam, while the second, the Borgila, had been abandoned by her crew. G7 put a salvage party aboard Borgila until the Norwegian destroyer  arrived to take over.

In October 1918 G7 was on patrol in the North Sea. Communications were lost on 23 October and she was declared lost on 1 November.

Notes

References
 
 
 
 

 

British G-class submarines
World War I submarines of the United Kingdom
Ships built on the River Tyne
Royal Navy ship names
1916 ships
Maritime incidents in 1918
Missing ships
World War I shipwrecks in the North Sea
Ships built by Armstrong Whitworth